The Malaysian Islamic Party (PAS;) is an Islamist political party in Malaysia. As the party focused on Islamic fundamentalism, PAS's electoral base are largely in Peninsular Malaysia's rural and conservative northern and eastern coasts, particularly in the states of Kelantan, Kedah, Perlis, Terengganu, Pahang and also in some of the rural parts in Perak.

The party was a component party of the then governing Perikatan Nasional (PN) coalition which came to power as a result of the 2020–21 Malaysian political crisis. The party governs either solely or as coalition partners in the states of Kelantan, Terengganu, Kedah, Perlis and Sabah. In the past, it was a coalition partner in the state governments of Penang and Selangor as part of the federal opposition between 2008 and 2018. 

Since the 2022 Malaysian general election, the party holds 43 of the 222 seats in the federal Dewan Rakyat, being the largest individual party, and has elected parliamentarians or state assembly members in eight of the country's 13 states. Internationally, PAS is affliated with the Muslim Brotherhood.

History

Origins 
The post-World War II period, while Malaya was still under British colonial rule, saw the emergence of the country's first formal Islamic political movements. The Malay Nationalist Party (MNP), a left-wing nationalist organisation, was formed in October 1945 and led by Burhanuddin al-Helmy, who would later become the president of PAS. Out of the MNP arose the Pan Malayan Supreme Islamic Council (Majlis Agama Tertinggi Sa-Malaya or MATA) in 1947, and MATA in turn formed the party Hizbul Muslimin (Muslim People's Party of Malaya) in 1948. The central aim of Hizbul Muslimin was the establishment of an independent Malaya as an Islamic state. However, the party did not live beyond 1948. The Malayan Emergency of that year, while a British–Communist dispute, saw the colonial administration arrest a number of the party's leaders, and the nascent group disbanded. Nevertheless, the party served as a forerunner to PAS, supplying both the ideology upon which PAS was formed and some of PAS's key leaders in its early years.

Party formation 
PAS was founded on 24 November 1951, as the Persatuan Islam Sa-Malaya (Pan Malayan Islamic Union) at a meeting in Butterworth, Penang. Shortly after it was renamed Persatuan Islam sa-Tanah Melayu (Tanah Melayu means "Land of the Malays" and was used by Malays to mean Malaya). It became known as the Pan Malayan Islamic Party (PMIP) before the 1955 election as the registrar of society required it to incorporate the word "party" into its name.  Its acronym PAS, originally used in Malay but became more widely adopted in the 1970s, is based the written form in Jawi (ڤاس). 

The formation of the party was the culmination of a growing desire among Muslim clerics within the United Malays National Organisation to formalise a discrete Islamic political organisation. However, the lines between UMNO and the new party were initially blurred. PAS allowed dual membership of both parties, and many of its early senior leaders were also UMNO members. He lasted in the position only until 1953, when he fell out of favour with the party, which was now developing a more distinct identity, and returned to the UMNO fold. Fuad's departure coincided with the end of dual membership.

The party's first electoral test was the pre-independence 1955 election to the Federal Legislative Council, the body that preceded the national parliament. 52 single-member seats were up for election; PAS fielded 11 candidates. Hampered by a lack of funds and party organisation, PAS succeeded in having only one candidate elected: Ahmad Tuan Hussein, a teacher at an Islamic school in Kerian, Perak. He was the only opposition member of the council; the other 51 seats were won by members of the Alliance coalition between UMNO, the Malaysian Chinese Association and the Malaysian Indian Congress. PAS' performance in the election weakened its hand in negotiations with the British over the terms of Malayan independence. Its advocacy for the protection of Malay and Muslim rights, including the recognition of Islam as the country's official religion, was ignored. Alias stepped down from the presidency in 1956, handing it voluntarily to the radical nationalist Burhanuddin al-Helmy. This change exemplified a broader trend among PAS's leadership in the late 1950s: the party's upper echelons gradually became filled with nationalists and long-time UMNO opponents, replacing the UMNO clerics who had initially led the party.

Left-wing Islamism 
Burhanuddin al-Helmy, a prominent anti-colonialist, steered PAS in a socialist and nationalist direction and set about strengthening the party's internal structure and geographic reach. In the 1959 election, Malaya's first since independence, the party's focus on rural constituencies, especially in the north, paid off. Thirteen PAS candidates were elected to the 104-member House of Representatives, and the party took control of the legislative assemblies of the northern states of Kelantan and Terengganu.

However, Burhanuddin's leftist Pas-Islamism, under which PAS sought greater ties between the Muslim peoples of Malaya and the Indonesian archipelago, soon led the party into a wedge. The Indonesia–Malaysia confrontation of 1963–66 turned popular Malayan opinion against Indonesia. PAS's attacks on Tunku Abdul Rahman's Alliance government for seeking Western assistance during the confrontation, and the party's continued support for Southeast Asian PAS-Islamism, led to a loss of support in the 1964 election. The party's parliamentary cohort was reduced to nine. The party became further marginalised the following year, when Burhanuddin was detained without trial under the Internal Security Act on allegations that he had collaborated with Indonesia.

Political circumstances in the country had changed by the 1969 election. The Konfrontasi had ended, Burhanuddin had been released from custody although was too ill to campaign actively, and the Alliance coalition was suffering from internal division as well as unpopularity. PAS' vote rose to over 20 percent of the national electorate, netting the party 12 seats in Parliament. However, the parliament would not convene until 1971 as the 13 May race riots resulted in the declaration of a state of emergency. The country would be run by a National Operations Council for the following two years. In the meantime, Burhanuddin died in October 1969 and was replaced as PAS' president by his deputy, Asri Muda.

Pivot to Malay nationalism 
Asri came to the presidency having been PAS's de facto leader during Burhanuddin's long illness. But this did not mean a seamless transition for the party. While Burhanuddin had been sympathetic to left-wing causes and parties in Malaysia, Asri was first and foremost a Malay nationalist, and was hostile to leftist politics. One of his first acts as President of PAS was to part ways with the party's opposition allies on the left, such as the Malaysian People's Party. Ideologically, Asri's presidency would see the party shift markedly away from the Pas-Islamism of Burhanuddin. The party became principally concerned with the protection and advancement of the rights of ethnic Malays. The party's activities also became solely focused on party politics, as reflected in the change of its name in 1971 from the "Persatuan Islam Se-Malaysia" (Pan-Malaysian Islamic Association) to the "Parti Islam Se-Malaysia" (Pan-Malaysian Islamic Party, but commonly referred to as Parti Islam, or PAS).

However, Asri's most radical change was still to come. In January 1972, he announced that PAS would be joining the Alliance Party coalition (which would soon rebrand itself as Barisan Nasional) as a junior partner to its main rival UMNO. The move was controversial within PAS, and some of its members and senior leaders either left the party or were purged by Asri. Asri's principal justification for joining UMNO in a coalition government was that after the 1969 race riots, Malay unity was paramount, and that this required a partnership between the country's two ethnic-Malay political parties. Asri himself was given a ministerial position in the cabinet of prime minister Abdul Razak Hussein.

The 1974 election saw PAS competing under the Barisan Nasional banner for the first and only time. The party won 14 parliamentary seats to UMNO's 62, cementing PAS's position as the junior of the coalition partners. PAS also found itself governing in coalition in Kelantan, which it had previously governed in its own right. PAS's vote in its northern strongholds was weakened by a loss of support to both its former opposition allies and renegade PAS candidates running on anti-Barisan Nasional tickets. Ultimately, it was Kelantan, Asri's home state and the base of political power, that would trigger the downfall of the UMNO–PAS partnership. After a conflict between Asri and the UMNO-favoured chief minister of the state, Mohamed Nasir, over investigations that Nasir initiated into Asri's financial dealings, Asri mobilised the PAS members of the Kelantan State Legislative Assembly to move a no-confidence motion against Nasir. The UMNO assemblymen staged a walk-out, abandoning Asri, driving an irreparable wedge through the coalition and causing a political crisis in the state. The Prime Minister Hussein Onn declared an emergency in the state, allowing the federal government to take control. Asri withdrew PAS from Barisan Nasional in December 1977.

The 1978 election underscored how disastrous PAS's foray into the Barisan Nasional had been. The party was reduced to five parliamentary seats and, in separate state-level elections in Kelantan, was routed by UMNO and the Pas-Malaysian Islamic Front (BERJASA), which Nasir had founded after leaving PAS. The party's fortunes in the Kelantan election were not helped by a ban on public election rallies; while the Barisan Nasional was able to campaign through a compliant mass media, public talks were the principal way in which PAS could reach voters. PAS fared little better in the 1982 election. In the face of a new prime minister, Mahathir Mohamad, and the decision of the popular Islamist youth leader Anwar Ibrahim to join UMNO instead of PAS, the party was unable to improve on its five parliamentary seats and failed to regain government in Kelantan. Meanwhile, the 1978 to 1982 period coincided with the rise of a new generation of leaders within the party, including foreign-educated Muslim clerics (or "ulama") such as Nik Abdul Aziz Nik Mat and Abdul Hadi Awang. This group sought to reorient PAS as an Islamist party and were fundamentally hostile to UMNO, whose Malay nationalist focus they saw to be at the expense of Islam. In 1980 the group succeeded in electing Yusof Rawa to the deputy presidency of the party, ousting the Asri loyalist Abu Bakar Omar. By the time of PAS's 1982 assembly, it was clear to Asri that the ulama faction had the numbers to defeat him. He resigned on the floor of the assembly, and subsequently attacked the party through the media, leading to his expulsion and the formation of splinter party, Parti Hizbul Muslimin Malaysia (HAMIM) by Asri in 1983. The following year, in 1983, Yusof was elevated to the presidency, unopposed.

Ulama takeover 
The ulama who took over PAS in 1982 drew from the 1979 Iranian revolution for inspiration in establishing an Islamic state; Yusof Rawa himself had served as Malaysia's Ambassador to Iran in the years preceding the revolution. Yusof openly rejected the Malay nationalism that characterised both UMNO and PAS under Asri Muda, considering it a narrow and ignorant philosophy that was contrary to the concept of a Muslim ummah. As if to exemplify the shift in the party's ideological outlook under Yusof and his ulama colleagues, the party's new leaders adopted a more conservative and religious form of dress, abandoning Malay and western clothing for traditional Arab religious garb.  Politics between UMNO and PAS became increasingly religious in nature. The Barisan Nasional government tried to counter the possible electoral appeal of PAS's Islamisation by creating a number of state-run Islamic institutions, such as the International Islamic University of Malaysia. PAS leaders responded by labelling such initiatives as superficial and hypocritical, UMNO leaders as "infidels", and UMNO as the "party of the devil".

The increasingly divisive rhetoric between UMNO and PAS produced deep divisions in Malay communities, especially in the northern states. Sometimes the divisions became violent, the most infamous example being the 1985 Memali incident, in which the government sanctioned a raid on a village led by the PAS cleric Ibrahim Libya, which left 14 civilians and four policemen dead. It was against this backdrop that the PAS ulama faced their first general election in 1986. The result was a whitewash for the Barisan Nasional coalition. PAS recorded its worst-ever election result, retaining only one seat in Parliament. PAS, in recovering from the defeat, had no choice but to retreat from its hardline Islamism and pursue a moderate course. By 1989, Yusof had become too ill to remain as PAS's president, and was replaced by his deputy, Fadzil Noor, another member of the ulama faction that now dominated the party.

Electoral revival in the 1990s 

While not abandoning PAS's ideological commitment to the establishment of an Islamic state, Fadzil Noor moderated the party's rhetoric. He also set about infusing the party's membership with young urban professionals in an attempt to diversify the leadership ranks beyond religious clerics. The 1990s also saw PAS engage in international Islamist movements. Abdul Hadi Awang became active in a number of international Islamic organisations and delegations, and Islamist parties abroad sent delegations to Malaysia to observe PAS.

The first electoral test of Fadzil's presidency was the 1990 election, which occurred against the backdrop of a split in UMNO out of which the Semangat 46 opposition party was formed. PAS joined Semangat 46 and two other Malay parties in the United Ummah Front ("Angkatan Perpaduan Ummah"), and won seven parliamentary seats. The new coalition swept the Barisan Nasional from power in Kelantan, winning all of its state assembly seats. Nik Abdul Aziz Nik Mat, a cleric who played a leading role in the 1982 takeover of the party, became Kelantan's Chief Minister, and would remain in the position until his retirement in 2013. One of the first acts of the PAS-led government in Kelantan was to seek to introduce hudud, a criminal punishment system for particular Islamic offences. The move was abandoned after it became clear that the law could not be enforced over the objections of the federal government.

PAS retained its seven parliamentary seats and the government of Kelantan in the 1995 election while all other opposition parties lost ground. By the time of the next election in 1999, circumstances external to PAS had changed its fortunes for the better. The 1997 Asian financial crisis split the Barisan Nasional government between supporters of the Prime Minister, Mahathir Mohamad, and his deputy, Anwar Ibrahim. Mahathir's sacking and subsequent detention without trial of Anwar in 1998 provoked widespread opposition, which PAS capitalised on more than any other opposition party. The party ran a sophisticated campaign for the 1999 election, taking advantage of the internet to bypass restrictions on print publications and managing to woo urban professional voters while retaining its traditional rural support base. For the first time, PAS joined the centre-left and secular Democratic Action Party in the Barisan Alternatif coalition which included the new party Keadilan, which was formed by Wan Azizah Wan Ismail, the wife of the now imprisoned Anwar. It resulted in PAS's second best electoral performance (behind those of 2022 general election). The party took 27 of 192 parliamentary seats and had landslide state-level victories in Kelantan and Terengganu.

PAS in the Pakatan Rakyat 
The death of Fadzil Noor in 2002, and his replacement by the conservative cleric Abdul Hadi Awang, coincided with a period of division within the party between its younger and professional leaders, who sought to make PAS's Islamist ideology more appealing to mainstream Malaysia, and its conservative, and generally older, clerics. The party was unable to reconcile the views of the two factions with a coherent definition of the "Islamic state" that the party's platform envisioned. The debate itself caused the DAP to break with the Barisan Alternatif coalition; as a secular party with mainly an ethnic Chinese support base, it could not support the vision of an Islamic state propagated by PAS's conservatives. PAS also found itself losing Malay support following the replacement of Mahathir as Prime Minister with Abdullah Badawi, a popular and moderate Muslim, and post-September 11 fears among the electorate about radical Islam in Southeast Asia. If the 1999 election had been the party's zenith, the 2004 poll was one of the lowest points in its history. In an expanded Parliament, PAS was reduced to seven seats. Abdul Hadi not only lost his parliamentary seat but saw the government he led in Terengganu thrown from office after one term.

The response of PAS to the 2004 election, like its response to the similar 1986 wipeout, was to abandon the hardline image that had contributed to its defeat. By now, the urban professional wing of the party's membership, brought into the party by Fadzil Noor in the 1990s, was ready to take charge. While Abdul Hadi's presidency was not under threat, the moderate faction, known as the "Erdogans" after the moderate Turkish Islamist leader Recep Tayyip Erdogan, had its members voted into other key positions in the party's 2005 general assembly. PAS was now able to attack Abdullah Badawi's government from both the right and the left: on the one hand, it criticised Abdullah's promotion of Islam Hadhari as a watered-down version of Islam; on the other, it attacked the government for its human rights record and promoted the causes of social and economic justice, including for non-Muslims. The party also capitalised on the growth of the internet and social media in Malaysia to bypass the pro-government mass media.

Ahead of the 2008 election PAS joined the DAP and Anwar Ibrahim's Keadilan, which was now known as People's Justice Party (PKR) in a new coalition, Pakatan Rakyat. The coalition handed the Barisan Nasional its worst-ever election result. Barisan Nasional lost its two-thirds majority in the House of Representatives, disabling it from passing constitutional amendments without opposition support. PAS won 23 seats; the Pakatan Rakyat as a whole won 82. At state level, decades-old Barisan Nasional governments fell in Kedah, Perak and Selangor. PAS now governed Kedah and Kelantan (led respectively by Azizan Abdul Razak and Nik Abdul Aziz Nik Mat) and supplied the Chief Minister of Perak (Nizar Jamaluddin) in a Pakatan Rakyat coalition government.

PAS's 2009 general assembly saw latent fissures within the party come out into the open. The incumbent deputy president Nasharudin Mat Isa, a Malay nationalist who promoted greater co-operation between PAS and UMNO, was challenged by two moderate candidates. Nasharudin survived with the backing of the conservative ulama faction; his two opponents had split the moderate vote. But at the 2011 assembly, Nasharudin was not so lucky: Mohamad Sabu, a leading moderate close to Anwar Ibrahim, commanded the support of the "Erdogan" wing and toppled him. Sabu's election was a significant defeat for the ulama faction. He was the first non-cleric to serve as the party's deputy president in over 20 years.

The Pakatan Rakyat coalition went into the 2013 election facing Najib Razak, who had replaced Abdullah as Prime Minister in 2009 but failed to improve the government's fortunes, especially among urban voters. PAS made a concerted effort to expand its voter base beyond the northern peninsula states, and campaigned heavily in Johor, where it had never won a parliamentary seat. The election witnessed a significant degree of cross-over ethnic voting: Chinese voters in Malay-majority seats decided in large numbers to support PAS, to maximise the chances of a national Pakatan Rakyat victory. Pakatan Rakyat garnered 50.8 percent of the national popular vote but could not win a majority in parliament. PAS, however, suffered a net loss of two parliamentary seats. This was principally attributable to a swing against the party in Kedah, where the party was removed from state government after one term and lost four parliamentary seats.

Leaving Pakatan Rakyat and forming Gagasan Sejahtera 
When PAS saw its share of seats shrink in the 2013 election, it started to reassert its Islamic agenda. DAP criticised its president Abdul Hadi Awang for pushing a bill on hudud without consulting his opposition partners. This incident led to the DAP announcing in March 2015 that it would no longer work with the PAS leader. The rift worsened after conservatives captured PAS leadership, as progressive leaders were voted out of office in party elections, characterised by the media as an intentional wipe out and purge, led to an exodus and the subsequent formation of Parti Amanah Negara by Mohamad Sabu. The party accepted a motion by its conservative ulama wing to sever ties with DAP. In response, DAP's Secretary-General Lim Guan Eng said that the Pakatan Rakyat coalition no longer exists as a result of the violation of the coalition's Common Policy Framework, of which PAS had violated by intentionally severing ties with DAP. The coalition was replaced by Pakatan Harapan, which the newly formed Parti Amanah joined as a founding member.

The party formed Gagasan Sejahtera with Malaysia National Alliance Party (IKATAN) in 2016, with BERJASA joining the coalition the same year. The coalition entered the 2018 Malaysian general election using the PAS logo and contested 158 seats, with PAS contesting 155 of them. The coalition was able to win 18 parliamentary seats as well as wrangle control of the state of Terrenganu from BN, which PAS had last ruled in 2004, in addition to retaining control of Kelantan. However, PAS was the only party to win any seats as both BERJASA and IKATAN remained without representation.

Renewed co-operation with UMNO and joining Perikatan Nasional 
In September 2019, UMNO decided to form a pact with PAS called Muafakat Nasional. Its express purpose was to unite the Malay Muslim communities for electoral purposes. However, this co-operation did not cover the rest of Barisan Nasional, which UMNO was member to, despite calls for a migration to the new alliance.  Barisan Nasional continued to function as a separate coalition of four parties comprising UMNO, MCA, MIC and PBRS.

During the Tanjung Piai by-election, PAS vice-president Mohd Amar Nik Abdullah stated that PAS would support the candidate nominated by Barisan Nasional, which was reaffirmed by PAS president Abdul Hadi Awang.

On 23 February 2020, PAS held an extraordinary meeting Janda Baik, Pahang together with the UMNO in the lead up to the 2020-21 Malaysian political crisis. PAS President Hadi Awang was among the entourage of then-opposition political leaders as well as members of government that visited the Yang di-Pertuan Agong to discuss the formation of a new government on 23 February.

On 24 February, Mahathir announced his resignation as prime minister, followed by the withdrawal of Parti Pribumi Bersatu Malaysia (BERSATU) as well as 11 PKR MPs led by Azmin Ali from Pakatan Rakyat's successor coalition, Pakatan Harapan. This led to the collapse of the government as the remaining three parties, the DAP, PKR, and Amanah did not have enough seats for a majority. PAS along with UMNO declared their support for Mahathir to remain as prime minister.

On 25 February, UMNO and PAS revealed that they had withdrawn their prior support for Mahathir to continue as prime minister, and instead called for the dissolution of parliament. It was previously reported that as all political factions voiced their support for Mahathir, he was intent on establishing a "unity government", which the two parties could not agree with. Annuar Musa, UMNO's secretary-general, said the basis of negotiations with Mahathir was that UMNO and PAS would lend their support to form an alternative coalition without DAP. Therefore, both PAS and UMNO instead announced their support for a snap election.

On 28 February, PAS then released a statement announcing their support for the BERSATU president, Muhyiddin Yassin to be appointed as the 8th Prime Minister, with every Muafakat Nasional MPs also signing statutory declarations in support of Muhyiddin.

On 29 February, BERSATU President Muhyiddin Yassin and his allies including party leaders from UMNO, PAS, Gabungan Parti Sarawak, Parti Bersatu Rakyat Sabah, and the Homeland Solidarity Party had an audience with the Agong to discuss the formation of a government. He announced that his coalition consisting of BERSATU, UMNO, PAS, PBRS, GPS, and STAR would be called Perikatan Nasional,. and claimed that they had majority support in parliament to elect a Prime Minister and to form a government.

In the Muhyiddin cabinet, which was formed on 10 March 2020, three PAS MPs became were given ministerial positions and five PAS MPs were afforded the position of deputy ministers.

Ideology and policies 

According to Farish A. Noor, a Malaysian academic who has written a complete history of PAS:

From the day PAS was formed, in November 1951, the long-term goal of creating an Islamic state in Malaysia has been the beacon that has driven successive generations of PAS leaders and members ever forward. What has changed is the meaning and content of the signifier 'Islamic state'

From time to time, PAS's pursuit of an "Islamic state" has involved attempts to legislate for hudud—an Islamic criminal justice system—in the states that it governs. Such laws would apply to all Muslims and would not apply to non-Muslims. PAS-dominated state assemblies in Kelantan and Terengganu passed hudud laws in the early 1990s and early 2000s respectively, although neither has ever been enforced due to opposition from the federal government. PAS returned to its pursuit of hudud laws after the 2013 election, signalling that it would table bills in the federal Parliament to allow the laws, still on the statute books in Kelantan, to be enforced. The bills would require a two-thirds majority in the Parliament as they involve constitutional amendments.

After PAS's electoral rout in 2004, the party sought to broaden its policies beyond Islamism. Among other things, the party focused on calling for improved civil liberties and race relations. However, these policy shifts have proven controversial within the party; conservatives have considered them part of a dilution of PAS's commitment to an Islamic state.

When PAS was defeated in Terengganu, enforcement of female dress codes was reduced. The state PAS government in Kelantan bans traditional Malay dance theatres, banned advertisements depicting women who are not fully clothed, and enforced the wearing of headscarves, although they allowed gender segregated cinemas and concerts. Some government-controlled bodies pressure non-Muslims to also wear headscarves, and all students of the International Islamic University of Malaysia and female officers in the Royal Malaysian Police are required to wear headscarves in public ceremonies.

The PAS party wishes that the death penalty be enacted for Muslims who attempt to convert, as part of their ultimate desire to turn Malaysia into an Islamic state. The party is also against the government-backed wave of Anti-Shi'a persecution.

Ties and linkages with the Muslim Brotherhood
PAS has also maintained close personal and ideological ties with the Egyptian Muslim Brotherhood. The party's relationship with the Muslim Brotherhood dates back to the 1940s when PAS's founders were exposed to the ideas and teachings of the Muslim Brotherhood while they were studying in Cairo during the 1940s. According to Wan Saiful Wan Jan of the think tank Institute for Democracy and Economic Affairs, the Muslim Brotherhood regards PAS as a model for a successful Muslim political party; since PAS has governed the state of Kelantan continually since 1990. PAS representatives are often invited to Muslim Brotherhood speaking engagements overseas. In 2012, PAS President Abdul Hadi Awang spoke alongside Muslim Brotherhood scholar Sheikh Yusuf al-Qaradawi at a speaking event in London. That same year, PAS representatives met with Muslim Brotherhood leaders Sheikh Mahdi Akif and Dr Muhammad Badie in Cairo.

According to Müller, PAS's current generation of leaders, the Ulama Leadership (Kepimpinan Ulama) were also influenced by Muslim Brotherhood ideology while studying in Egypt, Saudi Arabia and India during the 1980s. Muslim Brotherhood–inspired Islamic education methods (tarbiyah) and regular study circles (usrah/halaqah) were systematically introduced while networks were established with Muslim political parties and movements abroad. In April 2014, Awang criticised the governments of Saudi Arabia, Bahrain, and the United Arab Emirates for designating the Muslim Brotherhood as a terrorist organisation. In January 2016, former PAS leader Mujahid Yusof Rawa claimed that the Muslim Brotherhood's influence on PAS was limited to sharing the organisation's views on the role of Islam in society. Rawa also claimed that other local Muslim groups such as Angkatan Belia Islam Malaysia (ABIM; Muslim Youth Movement of Malaysia) and IKRAM were also sympathetic to the Muslim Brotherhood.

Controversies

Participation of 2018 Anti-ICERD Rally

In 2018, following the then-Prime Minister Mahathir Mohamad's announcement of the Seventh Mahathir cabinet's decision for the government to "ratify all remaining core UN instruments related to the protection of human rights", including International Convention on the Elimination of All Forms of Racial Discrimination (ICERD) and other five previously unratified conventions at a United Nations General Assembly, UMNO, PAS along with various non-governmental organisations, staged an Anti-ICERD Rally that was held at the Dataran Merdeka, Kuala Lumpur, to protest against the ratifications of the relevant international conventions, due to their perception that these human rights instruments contravene with the special position of the Malays, Bumiputera and Islam within the country; all of which are enshrined within the Malaysian Constitution.

2020–2022 Malaysian political crisis 

In February 2020, PAS President Abdul Hadi Awang, in concert with Bersatu President Muhyiddin Yassin, UMNO leaders Ahmad Zahid Hamidi and Ismail Sabri Yaakob and PKR defector members led by Azmin Ali, collectively convened at the Sheraton Petaling Jaya hotel to initiate a change in government, thus causing political instability by depriving the elected Pakatan Harapan government of a majority within the 14th Malaysian Parliament. As a result, Prime Minister Mahathir Mohamad (along with the Seventh Mahathir cabinet) tendered their resignation. In March 2020, after the Yang di-Pertuan Agong consulted all members of the 14th Malaysian Parliament, Muhyiddin Yassin was deemed to have the greatest support within Parliament and was selected as the 8th Prime Minister of Malaysia (without an electoral mandate).

Support for the Taliban

After the Taliban took over Kabul in 2021 and re-established an Islamic theocracy in Afghanistan, PAS international affairs and external relations committee chairman, Muhammad Khalil Abdul Hadi (also the son of the incumbent PAS president), congratulated the Islamist militant group for "successfully achieving victory for their country" on Twitter and Facebook, stating its liberation from Western powers.

In August 2021, Khalil also added that the Taliban had also become more moderate, spuriously claiming that women's rights (including women's freedom of movement) and the opportunities for women in the workforce were preserved. The unsubstantiated comments were widely condemned by numerous Malaysian social media users, and Muhammad Khalil Abdul Hadi's pro-Taliban posts on Facebook and Twitter were taken down in response. In March 2022, numerous independent news reports indicated that women and girls in Afghanistan were deprived (by decrees from the Taliban) from their ability to work, study or move freely within the country.

In October 2021, the leader of PAS's youth wing, Khairil Nizam Khirudin, proposed closer ties between PAS and the Taliban. He claimed that if China was able build ties with the Taliban, Malaysia should also do so.

In August 2021, PAS president Abdul Hadi Awang alleged that Western media made false accusations against the Taliban in order to advance an Islamophobic agenda, without studying and fully understanding the religion of Islam. He also repeated the Taliban claim, that the Taliban provided broad amnesty to government officials of the toppled Islamic Republic of Afghanistan; this claim was disputed as numerous independent reports with evidence indicated that the Taliban instead conducted enforced disappearances, summary executions and revenge killings against the former government officials. In the same article, Abdul Hadi Awang also alleged that the Taliban undertook a celebratory approach to the diversity of society within a multi-ethnic Afghanistan; this claim was also disputed as numerous evident news reports indicated that the Taliban engaged in the persecution of Hazaras (who numerous Taliban fighters deem as heretical), censorship against journalists and the news media, violence against journalists, arbitrary arrest and detention, political repression. Most notably, anyone from a religious minority who was an apostate of Islam is sentenced to death.

In February 2022, PAS president Abdul Hadi Awang spuriously alleged that various media were anti-Islam and slandered the Taliban, as according to him, the media were making unsubstantiated claims that the Taliban were denying girls and women the right to education. However, in March 2022, numerous evident news reports indicated that the Taliban prevented girls from attending secondary schools throughout the educational system of Afghanistan, generating widespread condemnation amid a global outcry.

Unconstitutional Kelantan Syariah Law amendment 
Sisters in Islam had criticized PAS for unconstitutional Shariah enactment on the recent update of the shariah law of Kelantan penal code including:
attempting to convert out of Islam
distortion of Islamic teachings
disrespecting the month of Ramadan
destroying houses of worship
disobeying parents
tattooing
undergoing plastic surgery.
This has sparked another controversy where the punishments include a jail term of not more than three years and a fine of up to RM5,000 or six strokes of the cane, and that the punishment is categorized under ta'zir (crimes with discretionary punishments) and not under hudud (Islamic Penal Code).

Flight attendant uniform criticism
PAS had spark another controversy where several of its lawmakers criticizing flight stewardess uniform attire they claimed that it is "too revealing" and added that is if flight stewardess are allowed to wear a hijab. Following those two statement, Sisters in Islam (SIS) said the issue had taken priority over other concerns somehow and they claim that ministerial directives should not interfere with a company's policy which may subject extra rebranding and production costs unless there were issues of safety, health and security. National Union of Flight Attendants Malaysia vice secretary-general S Shashi Kumar also publicly states that this complaint is "nonsensical" where he said the baju kebaya has become a fashion statement in southeast Asia. He said "Royal Brunei Airlines, Singapore Airlines and Garuda Indonesia have adopted the baju kebaya as the uniform for their female flight attendants." Transport minister Anthony Loke had said that “We are aware that this is not a new policy and there is nothing new, but there are no plans to change the existing policies on the dressing of stewards and stewardesses. The image and outfit depend on the airline company.".He added that “The Ministry has no restriction if Muslim air stewardesses choose to wear attire that are Syariah compliant as long as it fulfills the criteria set by CAAM,." It looks like PAS leaders lack knowledge of the Malay heritage and criticising their own traditional attire, responded the Global Human Rights Federation.

Timah whiskey
Following the fame of Malaysia's local liquor company, Timah whiskey after the winning of two silver medals in the Tasting Awards for the International Spirits Challenge 2020 (ISC) as well as the Annual San Francisco World Spirits Competition 2020 (SFWSC), PAS urged Ismail Sabri Yaakob's Cabinet for the company to be shut down stating that it "to prevent trigger the sensitivity of Muslims in the country" and "to avoid a precedent of new liquor companies emerging". Pas also states that they had to face numerous severe backlash. PAS Deputy President, Tuan Ibrahim Tuan Man, said that "We have always been consistent in our stance against alcohol because it is clear that it is haram according to the Quran,".

The request was denied by Ismail Sabri Yaakob's Cabinet where they had decided to rule against the decision. Prime Minister Ismail Sabri Yaakob state that the "cannot cause concern to the people in the context of race and religion".
PAS Deputy President, Tuan Ibrahim Tuan Man, states "For me, the ' people's anxiety ' can be considered as ' the confusion of the people, especially the Malay-Muslims ' ".  Tuan Ibrahim was also reported by the media on October 19 as saying that the brand and logo of Timah whiskey "can be confusing" and asked for it to be reviewed.

English language criticism
PAS president Abdul Hadi Awang has claimed that people who advocate for the English language to be taught in Malaysia are "stuck in a colonial mindset". Expanding on this point he said such Malaysians seemed to be embarrassed to use their national language (Malay) and had placed greater importance on English. In the PAS party newspaper Harakah Hadi wrote an article titled "Ignore the delirious voices which are trying to reduce the importance of the Malay language" where in it he stated that such advocates "are behaving like slaves to the former colonial masters despite having been freed from their clutches". Additionally in the same article he further went on to say that "advertisements in shops and the market as well as the names of cities and roads are named in English even though a majority of its target audience do not know English, at the same time, they do not care about whether their audiences consist of Malaysians who do not know English".

Structure and membership 
PAS's general assembly ("Muktamar") elects the party's president, Deputy President, three vice-presidents and a multi-member Central Working Committee. The assembly is held annually, but elections occur only once every two years. The assembly is composed mainly of delegates elected by individual local divisions of the party. The day-to-day administration of the party is carried out by its Secretary-General, a position appointed by the party's leadership. The Central Working Committee is ostensibly the party's principal decision-making body, although its decisions are susceptible to being overturned by the Syura Council, an unelected body composed only of Muslim clerics and led by the party's Spiritual Leader ("Musyidul 'Am"). The relationship between the different administrative bodies within the party occasionally causes conflict. In 2014, the Central Working Committee voted to support the nomination of Wan Azizah Wan Ismail, the President of the People's Justice Party, to be the Chief Minister of the Pakatan Rakyat government in Selangor. Abdul Hadi Awang, as PAS's president and with the backing of the Syura Council, overturned the decision and nominated different candidates.

The party has three recognised sub-organisations for different categories of party members: an ulama wing (the "Dewan Ulama") for Muslim clerics, a women's wing (the "Dewan Muslimat") and a youth wing (the "Dewan Pemuda"). Each wing elects its own leadership at its own general assembly. There is a fourth wing for non-Muslim supporters of the party, although it does not have the same recognised position in the party's structure as the other three wings.

PAS has approximately one million members, more than any other opposition party in Malaysia. PAS members often distinguish themselves from UMNO members through cultural and religious practices. For Islamic headwear, males who support PAS tend to prefer the white, soft kopiah, while UMNO supporters tend to wear the traditional Malay songkok, a rigid black cap. Some areas of Malaysia host rival mosques catering for the members and supporters of each party.

Current office bearers 

 Spiritual Leader:
 Haji Hashim Jasin
 Deputy Spiritual Leader:
 Ustaz Haji Ahmad Yakob
 President:
 Haji Abdul Hadi Awang
 Deputy President:
 Haji Tuan Ibrahim Tuan Man
 Vice-president:
 Ustaz Haji Idris Ahmad
 Haji Nik Mohd Amar Abdullah
 Prof. Dr. Ahmad Samsuri Mokhtar
 Dewan Ulamak's Chief:
 Ustaz Haji Ahmad Yahaya
 Dewan Pemuda's Chief:
 Ustaz Ahmad Fadhli Shaari
 Dewan Muslimat's Chief:
 Ustazah Hajah Nuridah Haji Mohd Salleh
 DHPP Chief:
 Balasubramaniam Nachiappan
 Secretary-General:
 Takiyuddin Hassan
 Deputy Secretary-General:
 Khairul Faizi Ahmad Kamil
 Khairul Fahmi Mat Som
 Treasurer:
 Iskandar Abdul Samad
 Information Chief:
 Ir Ts Khairil Nizam Khirudin
 Election Director:
 Haji Muhammad Sanusi Mohd. Nor

 Central Working Committee:
 Ustaz Muhammad Khalil Abdul Hadi
 Dr. Azman Ibrahim
 Dr. Halimah Ali
 Haji Kamaruzaman Mohamad
 Dr. Mohammad Fadzli Hassan
 Dr. Riduan Mohamad Nor
 Mohd Nasuruddin Daud
 Ustaz Ahmad Marzuk Shaari
 Dr. Mohd Zuhdi Marsuki
 Ustaz Nik Mohamad Abduh Nik Abdul Aziz
 Dr. Najihatussalehah Ahmad
 Ustaz Nasrudin Hassan Tantawi
 Ustazah Siti Zailah Mohd Yusoff
 Ustaz Haji Misbahul Munir Masduki
 Ahmad Amzad Mohamed @ Hashim
 Dr. Aliakhbar Gulasan
 Ustaz Dr Mahfodz Mohamed
 Dr Abd. Hakeem Johari
 Haji Mahfodz Mohamed
 Ir. Muhtar Suhaili
 Dr. Rosni Adam
 Haji Awang Solahuddin Hashim
 Dr. Mohd Mazri Yahya
 Wan Rohimi Wan Daud
 Ustaz Mohd Yusni Mat Piah
 Haji Mohamad Husain
 State Commissioner:
 Perlis : Mohd. Shukri Ramli
 Kedah : Ustaz Haji Ahmad Yahaya
 Kelantan : Ustaz Haji Ahmad Yakob
 Terengganu : Ustaz Haji Husin Awang
 Penang : Ustaz Haji Muhammad Fauzi Yusoff
 Perak : Haji Razman Zakaria
 Pahang : Ustaz Haji Rosli Abdul Jabar
 Selangor : Dr. Haji Ahmad Yunus Hairi
 Federal Territory : Ustaz Haji Azhar Yahya
 Negeri Sembilan : Haji Rafiei Mustapha
 Malacca : Ustaz Haji Zulkifli Ismail
 Johor : Ustaz Haji Abdullah Hussin
 Sabah : Paumin @ Aminuddin Aling
 Sarawak : Haji Jofri Jaraiee

List of presidents

Elected representatives

Dewan Negara (Senate)

Senators 

 His Majesty's appointee:
 N Balasubramaniam
 Kelantan:
 Mohd Apandi Mohamad
 Wan Martina
 Terengganu:
 Hussin Awang
 Hussin Ismail
 Kedah:
 Abd Nasir Idris
 Musoddak Ahmad

Dewan Rakyat (House of Representatives)

Members of Parliament of the 15th Malaysian Parliament 

Currently PAS is the largest political party in the House of Representatives, having 43 members.

Dewan Undangan Negeri (State Legislative Assembly)

Malaysian State Assembly Representatives 

PAS has 110 members of state legislative assemblies. It has representatives in every assembly other than those of Negeri Sembilan, Malacca and Sarawak. The party holds a majority in the Kelantan, Terengganu, Kedah and Perlis State Legislative Assemblies, and supplies all the members of the state's Executive Council (a body akin to a Cabinet), led by Menteri Besar,  Ahmad Yakob.

Kelantan State Legislative Assembly
Terengganu State Legislative Assembly
Kedah State Legislative Assembly
Pahang State Legislative Assembly

Perlis State Legislative Assembly
Perak State Legislative Assembly
Penang State Legislative Assembly

Selangor State Legislative Assembly
Johor State Legislative Assembly
Malacca State Legislative Assembly

Negeri Sembilan State Legislative Assembly
Sabah State Legislative Assembly
Sarawak State Legislative Assembly

PAS state governments 

PAS currently forms the state governments of Perlis, Kedah, Kelantan, and Terengganu.

Previously, when it was a part of Pakatan Rakyat, it was part of the Penang and Selangor state governments.

 Kelantan (1959-1978, 1990–present)
 Terengganu (1959–1961, 1999–2004, 2018–present)
 Johor (2020–2022)
 Perak (2008–2009, 2020–2022)
Perlis (2022–present)
 Kedah (2008–2013, 2020–present)
 Sabah (2020–2022)
 Penang (2008–2015)
 Selangor (2008–2018)

General election results

State election results

References

Footnotes

Cited texts

External links 

 
 Harakahdaily (PAS party newspaper in Malay)
 Harakahdaily (PAS party newspaper in English)

 
Political parties in Malaysia
Islamic political parties in Malaysia
Political parties established in 1951
1951 establishments in Malaya
Defunct political parties in Singapore
Far-right politics in Asia
Islamist groups
Islamism
Social conservative parties
Islamic organizations established in 1951